is a railway station in Suruga-ku, Shizuoka, Shizuoka Prefecture, Japan, operated by the private railway company, Shizuoka Railway (Shizutetsu).

Lines
Kusanagi Station is a station on the Shizuoka–Shimizu Line and is 6.4 kilometers from the starting point of the line at Shin-Shizuoka Station.

Connection to Kusanagi Station on the Tōkaidō Main Line is possible, with the two stations situated just 150m apart.

Station layout
The station has two side platforms. The station building is located on the north side of the Shin-Shimizu direction platform, and it had automated ticket machines, and automated turnstiles, which accept the LuLuCa smart card ticketing system as well as the PiTaPa and ICOCA IC cards. The station is wheelchair accessible.

Platforms

Adjacent stations

Station history
Kusanagi Station was established on December 9, 1908.

Passenger statistics
In fiscal 2017, the station was used by an average of 3797 passengers daily (boarding passengers only).

Surrounding area
Shizuoka Bank head office
Kusanagi Station
University of Shizuoka

See also
 List of railway stations in Japan

References

External links

 Shizuoka Railway official website

}

Railway stations in Shizuoka Prefecture
Railway stations in Japan opened in 1908
Railway stations in Shizuoka (city)